Lucifer was a British solo rock project active in the early 1970s, the alias of Denys Irving. Howard Marks clearly states in his autobiography Mr Nice (Secker and Warburg, 1996), that Lucifer was the solo work of Denys Irving.
This admission by Marks went unnoticed for years, so the identity of Lucifer was often falsely attributed to Peter Walker of The Purple Gang, due to the fact Walker started calling himself Lucifer in the late sixties.
There are also references to Lucifer and Denys (spelt Dennis) Irving in the biography Howard Marks, His Life and High Times (Unwin Hyman, 1988) by David Leigh, and the e-book Rogue Males: Richard Burton, Howard Marks and Sir Richard Burton (2010) by Rob Walters. Denys  Irving is also mentioned (in relation to film making) in the book A history of artists' film and video in Britain, 1897–2004, (British Film Institute Publishing, 2006) by David Curtis. The records were only available via mail order through adverts in papers such as Oz magazine (issue numbers 41/42), Record Mirror, New Musical Express and International Times (it or IT, issue numbers 126/127 & 128).

Biography 
Denys George Irving was born on 4 January 1944 in Colwyn Bay,  North Wales, and attended Dulwich College (1954–1961), where he won the Fawkes Memorial Scholarship to Balliol College, Oxford (1962) where he read Philosophy, Politics and Economics. He was married to the actress Merdelle Jordine (Crossroads (playing Trina MacDonald 41 episodes, 1978–1982), 'Timeslip' (1970 as Vera), Death May Be Your Santa Claus, Riddles of the Sphinx, The Sweeney) with whom he had a child. On 5 August 1976 Denys Irving was killed in a hang gliding accident at Mill Hill, Sussex. Denys was also a pioneer in early computer animation. Some of his work has recently been shown at the Tate Gallery, and his films are held in the LUX collection (see: http://www.lux.org.uk for further information).

Legacy 
In 1997 Cheater Slicks included a cover version of Lucifer's "Hypnosis" on their double CD Forgive Thee (ITR 054). In 2000, John Miller released a cover version of Lucifer's "Winter" on his Preference album (Polenta LEN18, available from www.cdvine.co.uk). Venien (of the black metal groups Von & Von Venien) has recorded a tribute version of "Fuck You" entitled "FvkU!"  with his new group  Dirty FvKn! Pistols  which will be released shortly. In 2012 the English composer Simon Rackham released the track "Lucifer's Song" (A Passacaglia in Memory of Denys Irving).   Since the re-release of Big Gun by Dynamic, every mention of Lucifer seems to include the reference to it being the work of the "acid-ravaged mind of Peter 'Lucifer' Walker ex-The Purple Gang". This unfounded attribution appears to come from the Rock Encyclopedia books by Vernon Joynson, but he gives no sources for his information, and Julian Cope also makes this error in his 2006 Head Heritage Exit LP review. The Denys Irving attribution comes from Howard Marks, Mike Ratledge of Soft Machine, Naomi Zack, (who co-produced and co-directed the film 'Exit'), and Denys' brother Andrew.

Discography

Albums 
 1972: Big Gun (LLP1)
 1972: Exit (LLP2) (Rock-electronics by Lucifer with sound-effects & dialogue from the soundtrack of the motor-cycle shock film 'Exit')
 1990s (?): Big Gun (with Luzifer on label) Bootleg recording LP.
 2006: Big Gun reissue on vinyl (DYNA030LP) and CD (DYNA030CD) Dynamic (Italy) a bootleg version.
 2015: Dance With The Devil Stoned Circle (STC2CD3006) 2 CDs bootleg

Singles 
 1971: "Don't care"/"Hypnosis"  (L001/L002)
 1972: "Fuck You"/"Bad" (L003/L004) An advert in NME on 29 July 1972 claimed all copies of this single were seized by Scotland Yard
 1972: "Pr**k"/"Want It" (L005/L006)
 1973: "Mr Jack"/"Mr Jack" (L007)

Film 
 1971: "EXIT" by Denys Irving, Naomi Zack & Lucifer Films Ltd 83 min. (Shown at the British Film Institute  on 17 April 2015 as part of 'Cinema Born Again: Radical Film from the 70s').

Compilations 
 2006: "Don't Care" appears on the unofficial CD Clinic – Mix 2006
 2011: "Fuck You" appears on the unofficial LP Do What Thou Wilt "The Satanic Rites Of British Rock 1970 – 1974" (Limited Edition of 200).

References 

 Howard Marks Mr Nice (see his autobiography Mr Nice pages 38, 104, 144/145).
 David Leigh Howard Marks, His Life and High Times

External links 
 Denys Irving's films at Lux
 International Times
 Lucifer on myspace
 OZ magazine
 'EXIT' at the BFI'

British rock music groups
British electronic music groups